This is a list of UN/LOCODEs for Denmark.

Note: 
DKAUU Aulum and DKAVL Avlum are the same place. 
There are two entries for Brønderslev DKBRO and DKBDV.

See also
 ISO 3166-2:DK

External links
 United Nations Economic Commission for Europe

Geography of Denmark
DK